Jind may refer to:
 Jind, a city in Haryana, India
 Jind district
 Jind State, a former princely state
 Jind (Vidhan Sabha constituency)
 Jind Kaur ( 1817–1863), ruler of the Sikh Empire

See also